Prasiolaceae is a family of green algae in the order Prasiolales.

References

Trebouxiophyceae families
Prasiolales